"Twelfth Street Rag" is a ragtime musical composition published by Euday L. Bowman in 1914.

Background
A friend of Euday Bowman known as "Raggedy Ed" declared his intention to open a pawn shop on 12th Street in Kansas City while the two were walking along it. Bowman is rumored to have said "If you get rich on those three balls, I'll write a piece on three notes to make myself rich." 

It was more than 15 years after Bowman composed the song before he actually wrote the music down in manuscript form. He returned to Texas briefly and tried to sell the piece to a company in Dallas; but he only had an offer of ten dollars for it and was told it really was not worth publishing. Returning to Kansas City, he sold it to Jenkins Music Company in 1913.  The Jenkins company felt Bowman's arrangement was far too difficult however, hiring C. E. Wheeler to simplify it. With a big advertising push "12th Street Rag" began to sell better. In 1919, James S. Sumner added lyrics. The song was popular with early Kansas City bands and became a hit after Bennie Moten recorded it for RCA Victor in 1927, the same year Louis Armstrong and His Hot Seven recorded it.

Other recordings
Euday Bowman, the composer, recorded and published his own recording of the piece, on Bowman 11748. Louis Armstrong and His Hot Seven recorded the song for Okeh Records in Chicago in May 1927. Krazy Kat and his orchestra perform the music in the 1930 cartoon The Bandmaster. A recording by Pee Wee Hunt was the Billboard number-one single for 1948, selling more than three million copies.  It was released as Capitol Records 15105 in May 1948. Donald Peers recorded the song in London on March 26, 1949. It was released by EMI on the His Master's Voice label as catalogue number B 9763.

Popular culture
The song is perhaps best known in the US and UK as the theme to The Joe Franklin Show; the version most associated with the program was Big Tiny Little's 1959 recording from his album Honky Tonk Piano (Brunswick BL (7)54049). A brief excerpt of the song can also be heard about 37 minutes into the 1996 film The English Patient. Since 1999, a steel guitar version has been featured as background music on the U.S. TV cartoon series by Nickelodeon, SpongeBob SquarePants. The Rastrelli Cello Quartet recorded a version for four cellos in 2006, on the album Vol. 1 - Concerto Grosso A LA Russe.

See also
List of pre-1920 jazz standards

References

Further reading 
Rags and Ragtime, A Musical History, by David A. Jasen and Trebor Jay Tichenor, 1978, Dover Publishing Mineola, NY
 Kansas City jazz : from ragtime to bebop--a history / Frank Driggs and Chuck Haddix, New York : Oxford University Press, 2005.

Rags
Compositions for solo piano
1910s jazz standards
1914 compositions
Okeh Records singles
Jazz standards